Songs from the Heart is a 1956 album by Jazz singer Johnny Hartman. It was Hartman's debut album and was released on the Bethlehem label. The album was reissued in 2000 with six additional tracks, alternate takes of songs from the original album.

Reception

John Bush reviewed Songs from the Heart for Allmusic and wrote that the album was "...a set of tender ballads, each word of which is treasured by Hartman's expansive, evocative voice." Bush described Hartman's musical support as "...soft, spare, and completely supportive".

Track listing 
 "What Is There to Say?" (Vernon Duke, E.Y. "Yip" Harburg) - 2:52
 "Ain't Misbehavin'" (Harry Brooks, Andy Razaf, Fats Waller) - 2:50
 "I Fall in Love Too Easily" (Sammy Cahn, Jule Styne) - 2:26
 "We'll Be Together Again" (Carl T. Fischer, Frankie Laine) - 3:03
 "Down in the Depths (On the Ninetieth Floor)" (Cole Porter) - 3:01
 "They Didn't Believe Me" (Jerome Kern, Herbert Reynolds) - 2:36
 "I'm Glad There Is You" (Jimmy Dorsey, Paul Mertz) - 2:32
 "When Your Lover Has Gone" (Einar A. Swan) - 3:10
 "I'll Remember April" (Gene DePaul, Patricia Johnston, Don Raye) - 3:12
 "I See Your Face Before Me" (Howard Dietz, Arthur Schwartz) - 3:34
 "September Song" (Maxwell Anderson, Kurt Weill) - 3:52
 "Moonlight in Vermont" (John Blackburn, Karl Suessdorf) - 3:08
Alternate takes released on 2000 CD reissue
"Down in the Depths" - 3:01
 "They Didn't Believe Me" - 2:43
 "I'm Glad There Is You" - 2:38
 "I'll Remember April" - 3:43
 "I See Your Face Before Me" - 4:10
 "September Song" - 3:56

Personnel 
Johnny Hartman - vocals
Howard McGhee - trumpet
Ralph Sharon - piano
Jay Cave - bass
Christy Febbo - drums

References 

1956 debut albums
Bethlehem Records albums
Johnny Hartman albums